The European Senior Ladies' Championship is an annual European amateur golf championship for women over 50 (previously 55) organized by the European Golf Association. 

The inaugural event was held in 1996, with 25 editions have been contested so far. It is now played in conjunction with the European Senior Men's Championship.

Format
The championship is opened to women aged above 50 years old.

The format of this competition consists of three rounds of stroke play, with a cut after the second round out of which the lowest 33 ladies' scores can qualify for the final round.

Past results

Source:

Nations Cup
From 2000 to 2006, a Nations Cup was contested. This was discontinued when a separate European Senior Ladies' Team Championship was introduced. 

Source:

See also
European Senior Men's Championship – corresponding EGA event for men
U.S. Senior Women's Amateur – corresponding USGA event

References

External links
European Golf Association: Full results

Amateur golf tournaments
Senior golf tournaments
Team golf tournaments 
Women's golf tournaments
European Golf Association championships
Recurring sporting events established in 1996